is a Japanese rally driver. He finished eighth on the 2006 Rally Japan to score one World Rally Championship point.

Career
Nutahara made his WRC debut in 1999, contesting Rally New Zealand and the China Rally in a Mitsubishi Lancer Evo V. In 2004 he competed in the Production World Rally Championship in a Mitsubishi Lancer Evo VIII, finishing the year ninth in the standings. In 2005 he improved to fourth in the final standings.

In 2006, driving a Mitsubishi Lancer Evo IX, Nutahara scored his first PWRC victory on Monte Carlo Rally. He then won again in Japan, also finishing eighth overall, and in Cyprus. He finished the PWRC season as runner-up. In 2007 and 2008 he finished seventh in the PWRC standings.

After a break from the WRC, Nutahara returned to contest the 2010 Rally Japan in a Ford Fiesta, finishing 23rd.

References

External links
Official website 

Living people
1963 births
People from Kōchi, Kōchi
Japanese rally drivers
World Rally Championship drivers
Intercontinental Rally Challenge drivers
People from Eniwa, Hokkaido